Bill Chappelle (March 22, 1881 – December 31, 1944) was an American professional baseball pitcher. He played in the major leagues in 1908, 1909, and 1914.

He was born in Waterloo, New York, and died in Mineola, New York.

Sources

Baseball players from New York (state)
1881 births
1944 deaths
Major League Baseball pitchers
Boston Doves players
Brooklyn Tip-Tops players
Cincinnati Reds players
Syracuse Stars (minor league baseball) players
Ilion Typewriters players
Des Moines Underwriters players
Harrisburg Senators players
Altoona Mountaineers players
Lancaster Red Roses players
Johnstown Johnnies players
Memphis Egyptians players
Rochester Bronchos players
Mobile Sea Gulls players
Chattanooga Lookouts players
Beaumont Oilers players
People from Waterloo, New York
Burials at Long Island National Cemetery